Guillemin effect is one of the magnetomechanical effects. It is connected with the tendency of a previously bent rod, made of magnetostrictive material, to be straightened, when subjected to magnetic field applied in the direction of rod's axis.

See also
 Magnetomechanical effects
 Magnetostriction
 Magnetocrystalline anisotropy

Magnetic ordering